The Woman Knight of Mirror Lake is a 2011 Chinese/Hong Kong biographical film about Chinese feminist revolutionary Qiu Jin, directed by Herman Yau and starring Huang Yi.

Plot
The film tells the story of Qiu Jin and her involvement in revolutionary uprisings against the Qing Dynasty in Anhui province. Influences on her life are shown through a series of flashbacks. As a child, Qiu Jin resisted having her feet bound according to common practice, and instead pursued her interests to learn horse riding, martial arts and literature with her father and brother. Through her poetry, she expresses her sorrow at the weak state of the nation and the repression of women. Finding other like minded women in Beijing and then travelling to Japan to study reinforces her view that nationalist action is required to reform China.

Returning to China, Qiu Jin takes the position as Xu Xilin's lieutenant, assisting with the training of revolutionaries at the Datong school and plotting the revolution. Xu Xilin is later captured while executing the assassination of the governor, and Qiu Jin is captured when government forces storm the Datong school. Qiu Jin is tortured in an attempt to reveal other conspirators and she is later executed.

Cast
 Huang Yi as Qiu Jin
 Kevin Cheng
 Pat Ha
 Dennis To as Xu Xilin
 Anthony Wong
 Lam Suet
 Hung Yan-yan

References

External links
 
 The Woman Knight of Mirror Lake at Hong Kong Cinemagic
 The Woman Knight of Mirror Lake at HKMDB

2010s biographical films
2011 films
2010s Mandarin-language films
Chinese biographical films
Films set in the 1900s
Films set in 20th-century Qing dynasty
Films directed by Herman Yau
Funimation
Hong Kong biographical films
2010s Hong Kong films